Godar Pir, also known as Godarpey, may refer to:
 Godar Pir-e Olya
 Godar Pir-e Sofla